Poacher was a 1970s English country music band from Warrington, England. Poacher won the British TV talent show New Faces in 1977. Poacher are best known for having preceded blues-rocker Frankie Miller's version of the song "Darlin'", by sax player Oscar Stewart Blandamer, which was a trans-Atlantic hit for Miller in 1978. The band backed Sarah Jory's first album.

References

English country music groups